Marcos Ytalo Benício da Silva (born 27 April 1996), commonly known as Buiú, is a Brazilian footballer who plays as a right back for Sampaio Corrêa.

Club career
Buiú was born in Fortaleza, Ceará, and finished his formation with hometown side Ceará SC. In 2014, he was loaned to Itapipoca for the year's Campeonato Cearense, but only featured in two matches for the club.

Upon returning, Buiú made his first team debut for Ceará in the 2014 Copa Fares Lopes, but never established himself as a regular starter. He scored his first senior goal on 27 February 2016, netting his team's third in a 3–1 Campeonato Cearense home win against Guarany de Sobral; in that match, he was also sent off due to the goal celebration.

On 7 March 2017, Buiú joined Joinville initially on a three-month contract. He moved to Ferroviária roughly one year later, but finished the year on loan at Bragantino, helping the latter side in their promotion to Série B.

On 8 February 2019, Buiú returned to Braga also on loan, but finished the year back at AFE in the Copa Paulista. For the 2020 season, he moved to Santo André before returning to Ceará, initially for their under-23 squad.

Buiú was definitely promoted to Ceará main squad in 2021, as a backup to new signing Gabriel Dias. He made his Série A debut on 30 May 2021, starting in a 3–2 home success over Grêmio.

Career statistics

References

External links
Ceará profile 

1996 births
Living people
Sportspeople from Fortaleza
Brazilian footballers
Association football defenders
Campeonato Brasileiro Série A players
Campeonato Brasileiro Série B players
Campeonato Brasileiro Série C players
Campeonato Brasileiro Série D players
Ceará Sporting Club players
Joinville Esporte Clube players
Associação Ferroviária de Esportes players
Clube Atlético Bragantino players
Esporte Clube Santo André players
Sampaio Corrêa Futebol Clube players